Alpısbaý Raxımulı (born June 1948) is a Chinese politician of Kazakh origin who served as vice chairman of the Standing Committee of the People's Congress of Xinjiang Uygur Autonomous Region from 2008 to 2013, deputy commander of Xinjiang Production and Construction Corps from 2001 to 2008, and governor of Ili Kazakh Autonomous Prefecture from 1998 to 2001.

Biography
Alpısbaý Raxımulı was born in Tacheng Prefecture, Xinjiang, in June 1948. He entered the workforce in October 1966, and joined the Communist Party of China (CPC) in November 1972. He taught at schools in Toli County for 10 years before becoming involved in politics in 1975. In June 1983, he was promoted to become deputy party secretary of Tacheng Prefecture, concurrently holding the governor position since June 1993. After a year as director of the Chemical Industry Department of Xinjiang Uygur Autonomous Region, he rose to become governor of Ili Kazakh Autonomous Prefecture in March 1998. In June 2001, he was commissioned as deputy commander of Xinjiang Production and Construction Corps, he remained in that position until January 2008, when he was made vice chairman of the Standing Committee of the People's Congress of Xinjiang Uygur Autonomous Region.

He was a delegate to the 7th, 8th and 9th National People's Congress.

References

1948 births
Living people
People from Tacheng Prefecture
Ili Kazakh Autonomous Prefecture governors
People's Republic of China politicians from Xinjiang
Chinese Communist Party politicians from Xinjiang
Delegates to the 7th National People's Congress
Delegates to the 8th National People's Congress
Delegates to the 9th National People's Congress